Distribuidora Internacional de Alimentación, S.A. (DIA) is a Spanish multinational hard-discount supermarket chain founded in 1979. DIA is the largest franchiser company in Spain and the fourth largest food sector franchiser in Europe. The Company operates under DIA brand in Spain, Argentina and Brazil and under Minipreço brand in Portugal. It has also operates 1.051 Clarel beauty stores in Spain.

At the end of 2021 it had 5.937 stores, of which 2,738 in Spain, 499 in Portugal, 912 in Argentina and 737 in Brazil, 46 distribution warehouses and approximately 38,573 employees, with a turnover of 6.6 billion Euros. Dia also markets up to 7,500 Dia branded products internationally.

Overview 
Dia is a discount supermarket chain which follows a policy of reduction of prices by means of minimizing operational costs. The furniture and decoration of the store are minimal. Costs are also reduced by limiting the choice of products to a narrow selection of European brand name and white-label Dia brand goods. Its policy of communication is based on mass media campaigns as well as periodic flyers featuring products which are on special sale.

The DIA chain was created in Spain in 1979 with the opening of its first store on Calle Valderrodrigo 10, in the Madrid urbanization of Saconia. In the 1990s, international expansion began with the acquisition of Minipreço in Portugal in 1993. It was followed by first Dia stores in Greece in 1995, in Argentina in 1997 and in Turkey in 1999.

Dia was acquired by Carrefour Group in 2000. The French Ed supermarket chain  which it was acquired by Carrefour in 1999 has been integrated into the Dia discount group. In 2001 Dia entered Brazil. In 2003, Dia opened first stores in the China, where the number of openings in a year reached 300 stores.

In 2007, Carrefour bought the Plus chain in Spain to integrate it into the Dia chain for 200 million euros.

In 2010, Carrefour transferred Dia Greece (who was 80% owned by Carrefour) to the joint-venture Carrefour Marniopolus in order to convert the stores under the Carrefour Marinopoulos or Carrefour Express brands.

In July 2011, Dia demerged from the Carrefour Group and was followed by its debut in Madrid's IBEX 35 stock market on 2 January 2012.

In January 2013, Dia took over 1,127 stores in Spain, 41 stores in Portugal and 4 distribution centers for 70.5 millions euros from the bankrupt German company Schlecker. Most of the stores were converted into beauty and personal care stores under the new brand Clarel.

The Turkish subsidiary of Dia with 1,200 stores in Turkey was sold to Yıldız Holding in 2013.

In June 2014, three years after it split from the Carrefour group, Dia's 800 stores in France, which were in difficulty, were bought for 600 million euros by Carrefour. The stores were converted to Carrefour brands or closed.

In July 2014, Dia acquired the 455 regional supermarkets of El Arbor, the 8th largest largest supermarket chain in Spain, for 1 euro due to financial problems. Most of the stores were rebranded in La Plaza de DIA. In November 2014 , Eroski sold 160 of its stores to Dia for 146 millions euros, in the regions of Andalusia, Extremadura, Castile and León and Castile-La Mancha, with the aim of getting out of debt.

Following the acquisitions, Dia closed 700 supermarkets in Spain between 2015 and 2019 due to the proximity between them or low sales.

In 2018 Dia sold its Chinese subsidiary to Suning. Dia had nearly 400 franchised stores in Shanghai. In 2013 closed its 160 stores in Beijing as a result of continued losses.

In May 2019, the LetterOne investment firm increased its share in the Dia Group to 69,76%, effectively taking control of the company. After that, a new board of directors was appointed and the Company launched a transformation plan to regain competitiveness and to make the Company profitable focusing on the operational excellence and on a new commercial offer.

On May 20, 2020, Stephan DuCharme became the executive president of the DIA Group.

References

External links

 

Retail companies established in 1966
Companies based in the Community of Madrid
Supermarkets of Spain
Discount stores
Companies listed on the Madrid Stock Exchange
Publicly traded companies
Spanish brands
Spanish companies established in 1966
Food retailers
Las Rozas de Madrid
Distribution (marketing)
Supermarkets of Brazil
Companies of Spain
2000 mergers and acquisitions